North East Island may refer to:

 North East Island, New Zealand, main island of the Snares Island group
 Oromaki / North East Island, New Zealand a small island in Manawatāwhi/Three Kings Islands group
 North East Island (Tasmania), Australia
 North East Island , Chuuk State (Truk) Federated States of Micronesia

See also
 North East Island National Park, Queensland, Australia
 North East Penang Island, Malaysia
 North and East Island group, a group of islands in the Blenheim Reef region of the Chagos Archipelago, British Indian Ocean Territory